Article 120 of the Constitution of Greece, otherwise known as the Final Provision, is the final article of the Constitution of Greece. 

It stipulates the entry into force of the Constitution (paragraph 1), respect  towards the Constitution and the law and devotion  to the Fatherland and to Democracy (paragraph 2), the obligation to prosecute usurpation of popular sovereignty (paragraph 3) and the right to resist (paragraph 4). It belongs to Section Ⅳ of the Greek Constitution, Special, Final and Transitory Provisions.

Text of the article
The full text of the article in Greek:

The official English translation:

Notes
Paragraph 1: The  "provisional President of  the  Republic" mentioned was Michail Stasinopoulos, who was elected as President of the Republic by a majority in the Hellenic Parliament. He served as Head of State from 18 December 1974, succeeding President pro tempore Phaedon Gizikis, until 19 July 1975, that is, until the finalization of the new political institutions by the revisionary national assembly through the promulgation of the new Constitution of Greece.

Paragraphs 2 & 3: The 1975 Constitution is the first to include provisions regarding respect towards  "law [...] and  devotion  to  the Fatherland and to  Democracy" defined as a "fundamental duty of all Greeks", as well as the obligation to legally prosecute usurpation of popular sovereignty and constitutional order.

Paragraph 4 - The right to resist: This paragraph incorporates the pre-existing article 114 of the 1952 Constitution (Identical to article 107 of the 1844 Constitution and article 111 of the 1911 Constitution):
 translated as 
alongside "the right and the duty to resist by all possible means" any violent attempt to abolish the Constitution. 

Paragraph 4 does not, in any way, stipulate ownership of firearms, or apply in the cases of contravention of articles of the constitution, cession of national sovereignty (e.g. accession to the European Union) or a state of siege (pursuant to Article 48 of the Constitution). As such, it is to be considered active in cases when institutional bodies (such as the Parliament) are unable to function properly and monitor the observance of the Constitution, like that of a coup d'état or foreign occupation.

Use as a political motto 
1-1-4, referencing article 114 of the 1952 Constitution (see above), was a political motto of the 1960s, used by United Democratic Left and Centre Union youth wings against Constantine Karamanlis's National Radical Union after the 1961 Greek legislative election, widely considered to have been rigged, and later on by PAK against the Regime of the Colonels. It has fallen out of use following Metapolitefsi.

References

Constitution of Greece
Ancient Greek constitutions